Alpensia Ski Jumping Centre (알펜시아 스키점프 경기장) is a ski jumping hills located at Alpensia Resort in Pyeongchang, South Korea. They hosted the ski jumping and the nordic combined events during the 2018 Winter Olympics. They also operate as an association football venue by using their landing area as the pitch.

History 
The ski jumping hills hosted the ski jumping and the nordic combined events at the 2018 Winter Olympics. The stadium holds a maximum of 13,500 spectators, and was built in 2008; for the Olympics, the capacity was reduced to 8,500 seats.

Ski jumping events

Men

Ladies

References

External links 
 2018 Winter Olympics, Alpensia Ski Jumping Stadium Page 

Venues of the 2018 Winter Olympics
Sports venues in Pyeongchang County
Multi-purpose stadiums in South Korea
Ski jumping venues in South Korea
Sports venues completed in 2008
Olympic Nordic combined venues
Olympic ski jumping venues
K League 1 stadiums